Feroz is a 1984 Spanish fantasy film directed by Manuel Gutiérrez Aragón. It was screened in the Un Certain Regard section at the 1984 Cannes Film Festival.

Cast
 Fernando Fernán Gómez - Luis
 Frédéric de Pasquale - Andrés (as Frederic de Pasquale)
 Javier García
 Elene Lizarralde - Ana
 Julio César Sanz - Pablo
 Pedro del Río
 José Antonio Gálvez - (as Antonio Gálvez)
 Matilde Grange
 Margarita Calahorra
 José Rodríguez
 María José Parra
 Mercedes Marfil
 Agustín Arranz
 Valeriano de la Llama
 Carlos Cano
 Francisco Menéndez
 Marta Suárez

References

External links

1984 films
1984 fantasy films
1980s Spanish-language films
Spanish fantasy films
Films directed by Manuel Gutiérrez Aragón
1980s Spanish films